Endure is the third studio album by the New Orleans punk band Special Interest, released in 2022.

It received significant critical notice, including a "Best New Music" review from Pitchfork, "Album of the Week" designation from BrooklynVegan, and four stars from The Guardian. It received a Metacritic score of 84, indicating "univeral acclaim."

Track listing

References

2022 albums